Glounthaune is a village in County Cork, Ireland, some  east of Cork city, on the north shore of Cork Harbour, the estuary of the River Lee.

Transport
The village was originally a planned town built in 1810 on a tidal quay wall and named at that time "New Glanmire". It is served by the commuter railway line between Cork and Cóbh. The next station in the Cork direction is Little Island, while towards Cóbh the next stop is at Fota Island. With the reopening, in 2009, of the railway line to Midleton, Glounthaune railway station became the junction between the Cóbh and Midleton lines.

Sport
The parish of Glounthaune is the main base for Gaelic Athletic Association club Erin's Own GAA. Erin's Own won the Cork Senior Hurling Championship on three occasions: in 1992, 2006 (defeating Cloyne) and 2007 (defeating Newtownshandrum). Association football (soccer) is also played in Glounthaune, with Glounthaune United A.F.C. fielding teams in the Cork Schoolboys League.

Knockraha Badminton Club train in Glouthaune in Erin's Own GAA hall.

Father Theobald Mathew's Tower
In 1842, Glounthaune landowner William O'Connor built a castellated neo-Gothic stone tower to commemorate the teetotalist, abolitionist and Irish Famine relief worker Father Theobald Mathew on what was then called Mount Patrick and is now known as Tower Hill in Glounthaune. The tower is still standing and has since been converted into a private residence while retaining many of its original features including a life-sized statue of Father Mathew. The refurbished and modernised tower was sold in 2014.

People
Cathal Coughlan (d. 2022), singer-songwriter
Brian Corcoran, inter-county hurler and footballer
Tomás O'Leary, Munster and Ireland rugby player
Denzil Lacey, broadcaster

See also

 Metropolitan Cork

References

Towns and villages in County Cork